4x4 ("Four by four") refers to four-wheel drive.

4x4 or 4×4 may also refer to:

Film
 4x4 (1965 film), a Nordic film
 4x4 (2019 film), an Argentine-Spanish film

Music
 4x4 (band), a Ghanaian hip hop group

Albums
 4x4 (Carla Bley album), 2000
 4x4 (Casiopea album), 1982
 4×4 (Granger Smith EP), 2015
 4x4, by Gemelli Diversi, 2000

Songs
 "4x4" (song), by Miley Cyrus, 2013
 "4x4", by Boiler Room, 2001

See also